Thomas Ewing (1789–1871) was a U.S. politician.

Thomas Ewing may also refer to:
 Thomas Ewing (American Revolution) (1730–1790), battalion commander in the Maryland Flying Camp during the American Revolutionary War
 Thomas Ewing Jr. (1829–1896), his son, U.S. politician
 Thomas Ewing (Australian politician) (1856–1920)
 Thomas W. Ewing (born 1935), U.S. politician
 Thomas Ewing III (1862–1942), Commissioner of the U.S. Patent Office
 Tommy Ewing (born 1937), Scottish footballer

See also
 Thomas Ewing Sherman (1856–1933), American lawyer, educator, and Catholic priest